Patrick Lyng (born 2 December 1996) is an Irish hurler who plays as a left wing-forward for the Kilkenny senior team.

Born in Inistioge, County Kilkenny, Lyng first played competitive hurling at juvenile and underage levels with the Rower–Inistioge club, winning minor and under-21 championship medals.

Lyng made his debut on the inter-county scene at the age of seventeen when he was selected for the Kilkenny minor team. He enjoyed one championship season with the minor team, culminating with the winning of an All-Ireland medal in 2014. He subsequently joined the Kilkenny under-21 team, winning a Leinster medal in 2017. Lyng made his debut with the Kilkenny senior team during the 2017 league.

Career statistics

Honours

Rower–Inistioge
Kilkenny Under-21 Hurling Championship (1): 2017
Kilkenny Minor Hurling Championship (1): 2013

Kilkenny
National Hurling League (1): 2018
Leinster Under-21 Hurling Championship (1): 2017
All-Ireland Minor Hurling Championship (1): 2014
Leinster Minor Hurling Championship (1): 2014

References

1996 births
Living people
Rower-Inistioge hurlers
Kilkenny inter-county hurlers